Pigea is a genus of flowering plants belonging to the family Violaceae.

Its native range is Australia.

Species:

Pigea calycina 
Pigea floribunda 
Pigea monopetala

References

Violaceae
Malpighiales genera